Union Square/Market Street station is an underground Muni Metro light rail station located adjacent to Union Square in San Francisco, California. It opened on November 19, 2022, as part of the Central Subway project. It has been the penultimate northbound station on the T Third Street since T service moved to the Central Subway on January 7, 2023.

Construction 

The station is located under Stockton Street between Geary Street and Market Street. The main entrance is on Geary Street at the southeast corner of Union Square. The south end of the station is connected to the mezzanine level of the existing Powell Street station outside fare control. The existing entrance to Powell Street station on Stockton Street at Ellis Street was purchased from BART for one dollar, and was temporarily closed in 2014 so it could be converted into a shared entrance to both stations.

Station excavation was completed by July 2017, and concrete was poured for the station floor.

Stockton Street reopened between Geary Street and Ellis Street on February 22, 2019. Muni route // and  buses returned to lower Stockton Street and 4th Street on February 25; route  and  trolleybuses returned on April 13 after overhead wires were re-installed.

San Francisco Chronicle architecture critic John King called Union Square/Market Street the "most disappointing in terms of design" of the Central Subway stations. King criticized the bare concrete walls and large ceiling beams of the platform level, as well as the "nondescript" nature of the Union Square headhouse.

Artwork
Of the ten artworks installed for the Central Subway, three are located at Union Square/Market Street station:
Lucy in the Sky by Erwin Redl consists of Hundreds of  LED-array-illuminated translucent panels on the ceiling of the concourse level, programmed to change colors, display patterns, and animations.
Convergence: Commute Patterns by Hughen Starkweather consists of patterns on the glass deck and elevators of the Union Square headhouse superimposed on a topographical map, illustrating commute patterns in the Bay Area.

References

External links

SFMTA – Union Square/Market Street Station

Future Muni Metro stations
Market Street (San Francisco)
Railway stations located underground in California
Railway stations in the United States opened in 2022
Union Square, San Francisco